#osnrap is the debut studio album of Taiwanese rapper and singer OSN. It was released on 30 April 2019 by SKR Presents and contains a total of 10 tracks. The title of the album refers to the hashtag he use in his Instagram posts to share his music. His single "Without You" was the second most viewed Mandopop music video on YouTube in 2019.

Track listing

Music videos

Awards and nominations

References

2019 albums
Mandopop albums